Yelena Panova or Elena Panova may refer to:

Yelena Panova (bodybuilder) (born 1979), Russian bodybuilder
Yelena Panova (actress) (born 1977), Russian actress
Yelena Panova (discus thrower) (born 1987), Russian discus thrower